Chkalovsky (masculine), Chkalovskaya (feminine), or Chkalovskoye (neuter) is the name of several rural localities in Russia:
Chkalovsky, Republic of Kalmykia, a settlement in Chkalovskaya Rural Administration of Ketchenerovsky District of the Republic of Kalmykia
Chkalovsky, Republic of Karelia, a settlement in Loukhsky District of the Republic of Karelia
Chkalovsky, Kemerovo Oblast, a settlement in Chkalovskaya Rural Territory of Leninsk-Kuznetsky District of Kemerovo Oblast
Chkalovsky, Asekeyevsky District, Orenburg Oblast, a settlement in Chkalovsky Selsoviet of Asekeyevsky District of Orenburg Oblast
Chkalovsky, Sol-Iletsky District, Orenburg Oblast, a khutor in Boyevogorsky Selsoviet of Sol-Iletsky District of Orenburg Oblast
Chkalovsky, Stavropol Krai, a settlement in Novozhiznensky Selsoviet of Budyonnovsky District of Stavropol Krai
Chkalovskoye, Republic of Bashkortostan, a village in Kaltovsky Selsoviet of Iglinsky District of the Republic of Bashkortostan
Chkalovskoye, Primorsky Krai, a selo in Spassky District of Primorsky Krai
Chkalovskoye, Saratov Oblast, a selo in Rovensky District of Saratov Oblast